César Jiménez (born 13 September 1959) is a Dominican Republic diver. He competed in the men's 10 metre platform event at the 1980 Summer Olympics.

References

1959 births
Living people
Dominican Republic male divers
Olympic divers of the Dominican Republic
Divers at the 1980 Summer Olympics
Place of birth missing (living people)